John Douglas Driggs (June 16, 1927 – December 11, 2014) was an American politician. He served as mayor of Phoenix, Arizona from 1970 to 1974.

Biography 
He was an alumnus of Stanford University, where he earned an MBA degree. He then worked for Western Savings. Driggs was married to Gail and had five sons, 19 grandchildren and seven great grandchildren.

See also
Driggs family

References

20th-century American politicians
1927 births
2014 deaths
Businesspeople from Arizona
John Douglas
Mayors of Phoenix, Arizona
People from Douglas, Arizona
Stanford University alumni
20th-century American businesspeople